Venus is an unincorporated community in Maries County, in the U.S. state of Missouri.

History
A post office called Venus was established in 1912, and remained in operation until 1932. The community has the name of Venus Riley, a young citizen.

References

Unincorporated communities in Maries County, Missouri
Unincorporated communities in Missouri